Ram Kadam (28 August 1918 – 19 February 1997) was a noted Indian lavani composer and film score composer, who worked in Marathi cinema, during the 1940s to the 1990s, composing for nearly 200 films. He is most known for composing Lavani songs, a folk form of Maharashtra, and popular Lavani-based songs of hit film, Pinjra (1972), directed by V. Shantaram. He also composed music of plays.

Early life and background
Kadam initially played the clarinet in a band at Miraj, in southern Maharashtra. Thereafter, he learnt classical singing from noted classical singer Ustad Abdul Karim Khan, the doyen of Kirana gharana at Miraj. Subsequently, he also learned Lavani style of folk singing from noted Tamasha-singer Patthe Bapurao.

Career
Kadam started his film career as an office boy at the Prabhat Films based in Pune, co-founded by V. Shantaram, soon he started assisting music director, Sudhir Phadke . His first break as an independent music director came with Meeth Bhakar (1949) directed by Bhalji Pendharkar, he continued to work at Prabhat for the next nine years, before working independently. His noted films were Gavgund (1951), Sangte Aika (1959) directed by Anant Mane and Pinjra directed by V. Shantaram, which was a big hit, and still remembered for his songs. He also composed music for plays like Nartaki and Katha Aklechya Kandyachi.

In time, Kadam became noted lavani composer, beside being a leading composer of Marathi cinema, and composed music score for around 200 films, and later in his career became a film producer. He co-produced a tamasha-theme film Kela Ishara Jaata Jaata (1965) with frequent collaborators lyricist Jagdish Khebudkar and director Anant Mane . Thereafter he co-produced films, like Sugandhi Katta and Choricha Mamla.

Their success led to his forming, own production house called "Chitra Mauli". In 1985, he wrote, produced and directed his first film, Gad Jejuri Jejuri, starring Jaymala Kale,  and actor Nana Patekar in his Marathi film debut . The film had lyrics by P. Savalaram and G. D. Madgulkar  The film however was never commercially released.

His last film as a composer was Painjan (1995) directed by Ajay Sarpotdar.

He died on 19 February 1997, in Pune, at the age of 79. His biography, Chhinni Hatodyacha Ghaav was written by Madhu Potdar.

Personal life
He has two sons, Vijay and Uday Kadam, his elder son Vijay Kadam is also a music composer.

Filmography

Composer
 Kela Ishara Jata Jata (1965)
 Deva Tuzhi Sonyachi Jejuri (1967)
 Sangu Kashi Mi (1967)
 Bai Mee Bholi (1967)
 Ek Mati Anek Nati (1968) 
 Bai Mothi Bhagyachi (1968)
 Chhand Priticha (1968) 
 Manaacha Mujra (1969)
 Ganane Ghungroo Haravale (1970) 
 Songadya (1971) 
 Pinjra (1972)
  Kalavantin (1978)
 Aaitya Bilavar Nagoba (1979)
  Don Baika Phajeeti Aika (1982)
 Gad Jejuri Jejuri (1985)
 Gaon Tasa Changla Pan Veshila Tangla (1985)
 Bijli (1986)

Director
 Gad Jejuri Jejuri (1985)

References

Bibliography

External links
 

1918 births
1997 deaths
Marathi people
Indian musical theatre composers
Musicians from Maharashtra
20th-century Indian composers
Marathi film score composers
Indian male film score composers
20th-century male musicians